Alvand (also Romanized as Alwand) is a village in Neh Rural District, in the Central District of Nehbandan County, South Khorasan Province, Iran. At the 2016 census, its population was 61, in 26 families.

References 

Populated places in Nehbandan County